Darin R. Thomas is an American college baseball coach and former pitcher. He served as the head coach of the Texas–Arlington Mavericks (2008–2022).

Playing career
Thomas attended Seward County Community College in Liberal, Kansas. Thomas then accepted a scholarship to play at Oklahoma Christian College (OCC), to play college baseball for the OCC Eagles baseball team. While with the Eagles, Thomas was a 3 time First Team All-Sooner Athletic Conference selection.

Coaching career
Thomas immediately began his coaching career upon the completion of his college degree at Oklahoma Christian School. After two years at Oklahoma Christian School, he returned to Seward County as an assistant coach. Thomas spent 9 seasons as an assistant at Seward before being named an assistant at Texas–Arlington.

Thomas was promoted to head coach in the fall of 2007. Following a 26–31 first season as head coach, UT Arlington signed Thomas to a 3-year contract extension. On May 23, 2022, Thomas resigned as the head coach of the Mavericks.

Head coaching record

References

External links
Texas–Arlington Mavericks bio

Living people
Baseball pitchers
Seward County Saints baseball players
Oklahoma Christian Eagles baseball players
High school baseball coaches in the United States
Seward County Saints baseball coaches
UT Arlington Mavericks baseball coaches
Year of birth missing (living people)